The Clearfield Area School District is a midsized, rural, public school district. The district is one of the 500 public school districts of Pennsylvania. It is located within the central and northern portion of Clearfield County, Pennsylvania. The Clearfield Area School District serves the Borough of Clearfield and Bradford Township, Covington Township, Girard Township, Goshen Township, Knox Township, Lawrence Township and Pine Township. According to 2000 federal census data, Clearfield Area School District served a resident population of 20,215 people. By 2010, the district's population declined to 19,115 people. In 2009, the district residents' per capita income was $16,245 a year, while the median family income was $37,134. In the Commonwealth, the median family income was $49,501 and the United States median family income was $49,445, in 2010. The educational attainment levels for the school district population (25 years old and over) were 85.5% high school graduates and 11.9% college graduates.

The colors of the school district are red and black, and the mascot is the bison. The mascot is modeled after the look of an American bison.

Schools
Clearfield Area School District operates one combined middle/high school (7th-12th) and one elementary school (K-6th).

Clearfield Elementary School
Clearfield Area Junior/Senior High School
CASD Cyber Services K-12 or with Lincoln Interactive

High school students may choose to attend Clearfield County Career and Technology Center for training in the construction and mechanical trades. The Central Intermediate Unit IU10 provides the district with a wide variety of services like specialized education for disabled students and hearing, speech and visual disability services and professional development for staff and faculty.

Closed schools in 2014: Bradford Township Elementary School, Centre, Clearfield Area Middle School, Girard-Goshen Elementary School (2012)

Extracurriculars
Clearfield Area School District offers a variety of clubs, activities and an extensive sports program.

Sports
The district funds:

Boys
Baseball - AAA
Basketball- AAA
Cross Country - AA
Football - AAA
Golf - AAA
Soccer - AA
Swimming and Diving - AA
Tennis - AAA
Track and Field - AAA
Wrestling - AAA

Girls
Basketball - AAA
Cross Country - AA
Golf - AAA
Soccer (Fall) - AA
Softball - AAA
Swimming and Diving - AA
Girls' Tennis - AAA
Track and Field - AA
Volleyball - AA

Middle School Sports

Boys
Basketball
Football
Soccer
Track and Field
Wrestling	

Girls
Basketball
Soccer (Fall)
Softball 
Track and Field

According to PIAA directory July 2012

References

External links
 http://webarchive.loc.gov/all/20060610091123/http://www.clearfield.org/education/district/district.php?sectionid=1
 https://archive.today/20130414123447/http://www.clearfield.org/shaw
 Clearfield Area High School link https://web.archive.org/web/20070928020541/http://www.clearfield.org/education/club/club.php?sectionid=81

School districts in Clearfield County, Pennsylvania